The Ivaí River (Portuguese, Rio Ivaí) is a river of Paraná state in southern Brazil. It is a tributary of the Paraná River. Its official spelling is Ivaí, with variants including Ivahy and Ival.

The river basin is ecologically very degraded, with fragile and vulnerable soil. It contains the  Perobas Biological Reserve, a strictly protected conservation unit created in 2006.

See also
List of rivers of Paraná
 Tributaries of the Río de la Plata

References

Brazilian Ministry of Transport

Rivers of Paraná (state)
Tributaries of the Paraná River